The 1997 Swedish Touring Car Championship season was the 2nd season of the championship. It was decided over six race weekends (comprising twelve races) at six different circuits.

Jan Nilsson won the second championship of the STCC.

It was two-time DTM champion Mattias Ekström's touring car debut year driving a black Volvo 850 GLT.

Teams and Drivers

Race calendar and winners
All rounds were held in Sweden.

Drivers Championship
Points were awarded to the top ten drivers in a race as follows: 20, 15, 12, 10, 8, 6, 4, 3, 2, 1.
5 points were awarded to any driver who took part in qualifying. 
Classified finishers in Race 1 were reversed to decide the Race 2 grid.
The final meeting of the year saw double points awarded.

References

External links
 Touring-cars.net
 1997 Entry List

Swedish Touring Car Championship seasons
Swedish Touring Car Championship
Swedish Touring Car Championship season